The hepatic tanager (Piranga flava) is a medium-sized American songbird. Formerly placed in the tanager family (Thraupidae), it and other members of the genus Piranga are now classified in the cardinal family (Cardinalidae). The species's plumage and vocalizations are similar to other members of the cardinal family.

Etymology and taxonomy
The common name hepatic means "liver-coloured", namely, brownish-red. The specific name  is Latin for yellow or golden.

There are three subspecies groups, which may be separate species: 
 the hepatica group, breeding from Nicaragua north, in pine and pine-oak forests and partially migratory
 the lutea group (sometimes known as the tooth-billed tanager), resident from Costa Rica to northern and western South America in highland forest edges
 the flava group (sometimes known as the red tanager), resident in open woods elsewhere in South America

Description
Members of the northern group are larger and stockier than other Piranga tanagers and have a relatively short tail and a stout bill. Its brightest color is always on its forehead and throat. In all plumages, it has gray flanks, dusky cheeks, and a dark eye streak. The female is yellow, and the male is red.

Distribution and habitat
It ranges from the southwestern United States (Arizona, New Mexico, and locally in southern California and Colorado) to northern Argentina and Uruguay.

Behavior

The habits of the hepatic tanager are similar to those of the western tanager.

Its call is a low, dry chup like the hermit thrush. Its song is clearer than Thraupidae tanagers and far more similar to the song of the black-headed grosbeak, another member of the Cardinalidae. The flight call is a husky and rising weet.

It looks for food in the foliage of trees, moving slowly and methodically; different individuals use different strategies. In summer, the northern form largely eats insects, spiders and some fruit. In Mexico, it has been observed to eat nectar. From Oaxaca south, it follows swarms of army ants.

Even the northern population's behavior and life history are remarkably little known.

References

External links

Hepatic tanager Species Account – Cornell Lab of Ornithology
Hepatic tanager Stamps from Paraguay at bird-stamps.org

Piranga
Birds of Central America
Birds of South America
Birds of the Guianas
Birds of Brazil
Birds of the Amazon Basin
Birds of the Cerrado
Birds of the Pantanal
Birds of Paraguay
Native birds of the Southwestern United States
Birds of the Rio Grande valleys
Birds of Mexico
Birds of the Sierra Madre Occidental
Birds of the Sierra Madre Oriental
Birds of the Sierra Madre del Sur
Birds of the Trans-Mexican Volcanic Belt
Birds of Trinidad and Tobago
Birds described in 1822
Taxa named by Louis Jean Pierre Vieillot